The Georgia Salzburger Society, headquartered in historic Ebenezer, Georgia, celebrates the history and heritage of the Georgia Salzburgers who emigrated and settled in Old Ebenezer and New Ebenezer. It was established in 1925 as an independently operating genealogical and archaeological organization 

The Society operates a research library and a living history museum housing an extensive collection of artifacts. The museum is built on the site of the Ebenezer Orphanage, the first orphanage in the state of Georgia (1737). 

As of 2019, the Georgia Salzburger Society has over 1,700 members throughout the United States, as well as some international members.

See also 
 Johann Martin Boltzius
 John A. Treutlen

References

External links 
Georgia Salzburger Society online
List of documents in the Loest Research Library

Province of Georgia
Georgia Salzburgers
German emigrants to the Thirteen Colonies
Historical societies in Georgia (U.S. state)
Historical society museums in Georgia (U.S. state)
History of Effingham County, Georgia
History of Salzburg
Pre-statehood history of Georgia (U.S. state)